Weatherwax is a:

Surname:
 Paul Weatherwax, (1900–1960), American cutter
 Paul Weatherwax (botanist), (1888–1976), American professor of botany
 Seema Aissen Weatherwax (1905–2006), a Ukrainian political activist and photographer
 Frank (1902–1991) and Rudd Weatherwax (1907 – 1985), American actors and animal trainers
 Ken Weatherwax (1955–2014), American actor
 Marvin Weatherwax Jr., American politician

Character name:
 Granny Weatherwax, a character from Terry Pratchett's Discworld series
 Galder Weatherwax, a character in Terry Pratchett's novel The Light Fantastic
 John Weatherwax aka Jacky Wax a character in the Spenser novel Taming a Seahorse by Robert B Parker.

See also
 Weatherwax Glacier, Antarctica, named for physicist Allan T. Weatherwax
 

Surnames
English-language surnames
Surnames of British Isles origin
Surnames of English origin